Joseph Dean & Son Woolen Mill, also known as NVF Company, Newark Fibre Plant, is a historic woolen mill located at Newark in New Castle County, Delaware. The property includes seven contributing buildings and one contributing site. The oldest mill structure is a four-story stone structure with a corbelled brick cornice and flat roof.

It was added to the National Register of Historic Places in 1982.

References

Industrial buildings and structures on the National Register of Historic Places in Delaware
Industrial buildings completed in 1845
Buildings and structures in Newark, Delaware
Woollen mills
Textile mills in the United States
National Register of Historic Places in New Castle County, Delaware